The 2019 South American U-20 Championship was the 29th edition of the South American U-20 Championship, the biennial international youth football championship organised by CONMEBOL for the men's under-20 national teams of South America. It was held in Chile between 17 January and 10 February 2019.

The top four teams qualified for the 2019 FIFA U-20 World Cup in Poland as the CONMEBOL representatives. The top three teams qualified for the 2019 Pan American Games men's football tournament, in addition to Peru who had automatically qualified as hosts. However, due to the re-introduction of the CONMEBOL Pre-Olympic Tournament in 2020, the tournament was not used for qualifying for the 2020 Summer Olympics men's football tournament.

Ecuador won their first title. Argentina finished second, defending champions Uruguay finished third, while Colombia finished fourth.

Teams
All ten CONMEBOL member national teams entered the tournament.

Venues

According to ANFP sources, Chile was named as host country of the tournament during the CONMEBOL Executive Committee meeting held on 12 May 2015 at CONMEBOL headquarters in Luque, Paraguay. Estadio El Teniente in Rancagua, Estadio La Granja in Curicó and Estadio Fiscal in Talca were the venues chosen by CONMEBOL and ANFP.

Squads
 

Players born on or after 1 January 1999 were eligible to compete. Each team registered a squad of 23 players (three of whom must be goalkeepers).

Match officials
The referees were:

  Fernando Rapallini
 Assistant Referee 1: Ezequiel Brailovsky
 Assistant Referee 2: Gabriel Chade

  Gery Vargas
 Assistant Referee 1: José Antelo
 Assistant Referee 2: Edwar Saavedra

  Raphael Claus
 Assistant Referee 1: Kléber Lúcio Gil
 Assistant Referee 2: Bruno Pires

  Piero Maza
 Assistant Referee 1: Claudio Ríos
 Assistant Referee 2: José Retamal

  Nicolás Gallo
 Assistant Referee 1: John Alexander León
 Assistant Referee 2: Wílmar Navarro

  Carlos Orbe
 Assistant Referee 1: Juan Carlos Macías
 Assistant Referee 2: Ricardo Barén

  Mario Díaz de Vivar
 Assistant Referee 1: Roberto Cañete
 Assistant Referee 2: Darío Gaona

  Joel Alarcón
 Assistant Referee 1: Víctor Ráez
 Assistant Referee 2: Michael Orué

  Leodán González
 Assistant Referee 1: Richard Trinidad
 Assistant Referee 2: Carlos Barreiro

  Alexis Herrera
 Assistant Referee 1: Carlos Alexander López
 Assistant Referee 2: Jorge Urrego

Support Referees

  Facundo Tello (First stage)
  Ivo Méndez (Final stage)
  Cristian Garay
 Assistant Referee: Claudio Urrutia (Final stage)
 Assistant Referee: Alejandro Molina (Final stage)

  Arnaldo Samaniego (Final stage)
  Diego Haro (Final stage)

Draw
The draw of the tournament was held on 6 November 2018, 14:15 CLST (UTC−3), at the Teatro Municipal de Rancagua in Rancagua. The ten teams were drawn into two groups of five. The hosts Chile and the defending champions Uruguay were seeded into Group A and Group B respectively and assigned to position 1 in their group, while the remaining teams were placed into four "pairing pots" according to their results in the 2017 South American U-20 Championship (shown in brackets).

First stage
The top three teams in each group advanced to the final stage.

All times local, CLST (UTC−3).

Group A

Group B

Final stage

Winners

Goalscorers

Tournament best XI
The best XI team was a squad consisting of the eleven most impressive players at the tournament.

Qualification for international tournaments

Qualified teams for FIFA U-20 World Cup
The following four teams from CONMEBOL qualified for the 2019 FIFA U-20 World Cup.

1 Bold indicates champions for that year. Italic indicates hosts for that year.

Qualified teams for Pan American Games
The following four teams from CONMEBOL qualified for the 2019 Pan American Games men's football tournament, including Peru which qualified as hosts.

2 Bold indicates champions for that year. Italic indicates hosts for that year.

Broadcasting rights

South America
The tournament was broadcast by the following TV companies in South America.

References

External links
Sudamericano Sub 20 Chile 2019 , Official Web
Sudamericano Sub 20 Chile 2019, CONMEBOL.com

2019
2019 South American U-20 Championship
2019 in South American football
2019 in youth association football
2019 in Chilean football
January 2019 sports events in South America
February 2019 sports events in South America
Qualification tournaments for the 2019 Pan American Games
2019 FIFA U-20 World Cup qualification